The Cosmopolitan Club in Coimbatore, Tamil Nadu, India is a club started in 1891 by a group of local citizens. It is located in Race Course Road, in the city of Coimbatore.

History
The land for the club was purchased from Jayashree V.Murthy of Sulur on 25 July 1891. To an existing small shed, a clubhouse, a billiards room, card rooms and tennis courts were added. The front Porch was called Verandah club. A large tree in the vicinity was main meeting place of its members’ also called as Wisdom Tree.

Facilities
 Tennis courts
 Badminton court
 Billiards and Bridge room
 Library
 Bar, Party halls and Accommodation

Notable members
 C. S. Rathinasabapathy Mudaliar - Industrialist, often regarded as Father of Coimbatore.
C. Subramaniam - Former Union Minister and former Governor of Maharashtra
 R. K. Shanmugam Chettiar - India's first Finance Minister and Industrialist
 Nirupama Vaidyanathan - Tennis player

References

Organisations based in Coimbatore
Clubs and societies in India
Organizations established in 1891
1891 establishments in India